Abdullah ibn Abd al-Muttalib was the father of the Islamic prophet Muhammad. He was the son of Abd al-Muttalib ibn Hashim and Fatima bint Amr of the Makhzum Clan.

He was married to Āminah bint Wahb. Muhammad was their only offspring.

Name
ʿAbd Allāh means "servant of God" or "slave of God". His full name was ʿAbdullāh ibn ʿAbd al-Muṭṭalib ibn Hāshim ('Amr) ibn Abd Manāf (al-Mughīra) ibn Qusayy (Zayd) ibn Kilāb ibn Murra ibn Ka`b   ibn Lu'ayy ibn Ghālib ibn Fahr (Quraysh) ibn Mālik ibn an-Naḑr (Qays) ibn Kinānah ibn Khuzaymah ibn Mudrikah ('Āmir) ibn Ilyas ibn Muḍar ibn Nizār ibn Ma'ād ibn 'Adnān.

Marriage
His father chose for him Āminah daughter of Wahb ibn 'Abd Munāf who was the grandson of Zuhrah ibn Kilab, the brother of his great-great-grandfather Qusayy ibn Kilāb. Wahb had been the chief of Banu Zuhrah as well as its eldest and noblest member but had died some time previously and Āminah became a ward of his brother Wuhaib, who had succeeded him as chief of the clan.

His father went with him to the quarter of Banū Zuhrah. There, he sought the residence of Wuhayb and went in to ask for the hand of Wahb's daughter for his son. 'Abdullāh's father fixed his marriage with Aminah. It was said that a light shone out of his forehead and that this light was the promise of a Prophet as offspring. Many women approached 'Abdullāh, who is reported to have been a handsome man, so that they might gain the honor of producing his offspring. However it is believed that, as decided by God, the light was destined to be transferred to Āminah through 'Abdullāh after consummating the marriage. 'Abdullāh's father was the custodian of the Kaaba in Mecca. 'Abdullāh lived with Āminah among her relatives the first three days of the marriage. Afterwards, they moved together to the quarter of 'Abdul-Muttalib.

Death

Soon after their marriage 'Abdullāh was called to Palestine and Syria (in what is Ash-Shām or the Levant) on a trading caravan trip. When he left, Āminah was pregnant. 'Abdullāh was absent for several months in Gaza. On his way back he stopped for a longer rest with the family of his paternal grandmother, Salma bint Amr, who belonged to the Najjar clan of the Khazraj tribe in Medina. He was preparing to join a caravan to Mecca when he felt ill. The caravan went on without him to Mecca with news of his absence and disease. 'Abdul-Muttalib immediately sent his eldest son Al-Harith to Medina. However by the time Harith arrived, his brother Abdullah who was in his early twenties, was already dead and was buried shortly after he became unwell, Harith returned to Mecca to announce the death of 'Abdullāh to his aged father and his pregnant wife Āminah.

He was buried in Dar-ul-Nabeghah in Medina (today Saudi Arabia), and his mausoleum was demolished on the 20th or 21st January, 1978. Reportedly he was reburied in Al-Baqee' Graveyard, next to Muhammad's son Ibrahim.

Estate
'Abdullāh left five camels, a herd of sheep and goats, and an Abyssinian slave nurse, called Umm Ayman, who was to take care of his son Muhammad. This patrimony does not prove that 'Abdullāh was wealthy, but at the same time it does not prove that he was poor. Rather, it shows that Muhammad was his heir. Furthermore, 'Abdullāh was still a young man capable of working and of amassing a fortune. His father was still alive and none of his wealth had as yet been transferred to his sons.

Fate in the afterlife
Islamic scholars have long been divided over the religious beliefs of Muhammad's parents and their fate in the afterlife. One transmission by Abu Dawud and Ibn Majah states that Allah (God) refused to forgive Aminah for her kufr (disbelief). Another transmission in Musnad al-Bazzar states that the Muhammad's parents was brought back to life and accepted Islam, then returned to the Barzakh. Some Ash'ari and Shafi'i scholars argued that neither would be punished in the afterlife, as they were Ahl al-fatrah, or "People of the interval" between the prophetic messages of 'Isa (Jesus) and Muhammad. The concept of Ahl al-fatrah is not universally accepted among Islamic scholars, and there is debate concerning the extent of salvation available for active practitioners of Shirk (Polytheism), though the majority of scholars have come to agree with it, and disregard the ahadith (narrations) stating that Muhammad's parents were condemned to hell.

While a work attributed to Abu Hanifah, an early Sunni scholar, stated that both Aminah and Abdullah died upon their innate nature (Mata 'ala al-fitrah), some later authors of mawlid texts related a tradition in which Aminah and Abdullah were temporarily revived and embraced Islam. Scholars like Ibn Taymiyyah stated that this was a lie, though Al-Qurtubi stated that the concept did not disagree with Islamic theology. According to Ali al-Qari, the preferred view is that both the parents of Muhammad were Muslims. According to Al-Suyuti, Isma'il Haqqi, and other Islamic scholars, all of the narrations indicating that the parents of Muhammad were not forgiven were later abrogated when they were brought to life and accepted Islam. Shia Muslims believe that all of Muhammad's ancestors, Aminah included, were monotheists who practiced the shariah of Abraham, and were therefore entitled to Paradise. A Shia tradition states that Allah forbade the fires of Hell from touching either of Muhammad's parents.

See also 
 Abdullah (name)
 Adnan
 Adnanite Ishmaelite Arabs
 Bayt al-Mawlid, the house where Muhammad is believed to have been born
 Family tree of Muhammad

References 

546 births
570 deaths
6th-century Arabs
Family of Muhammad
Banu Hashim
Ancestors of Muhammad
Burials at Jannat al-Baqī